Pila is an Alpine ski-resort in the Aosta Valley region of northern Italy. It is a frazione of the comune of Gressan.

There are more than 24 pistes (>70 km total length), including 4 blue runs, 29 red runs and 4 black runs, with a pipe zone and a slopestyle zone. There is one cable car, 3 gondolas, 8 chairlifts and 5 conveyors.  The resort itself is at 1,814 metres altitude, while the highest skiing can be done at 2,700m.

The nearest city to Pila is Aosta, to which it is connected by road and also a cable car system.

It is the site of one of Laurent Chappis's works.

References

External links 
 Ski Resort Homepage
 Hotel
 THE SKI FACTFILE
 Pila ski resort guide

Frazioni of Aosta Valley
Cities and towns in Aosta Valley
Ski areas and resorts in Italy
Gressan
Italy geography articles needing translation from French Wikipedia